is the protagonist of Gege Akutami's manga Jujutsu Kaisen 0. Yuta Okkotsu is a teenager who is surrounded and helped by the spirit of Rika Orimoto, his childhood friend who died six years before the story and is cursed because both of them promised to get married when they grow up. In November 2016, Yuta met Satoru Gojo, a Jujutsu sorcerer under whose guidance he joined Tokyo Metropolitan Curse Technical School to control Rika's curse. Yuta also appears in the sequel Jujutsu Kaisen as an experienced warrior.

Akutami created Yuta alongside Rika before the creation of Jujutsu Kaisen 0 as a duo who work together. He compared Yuta with the Jujutsu Kaisen protagonist Yuji Itadori, whose roles in the narratives are similar because having to deal with inner beings with different personalities. In the 2021 animated film adaptation of the manga, Jujutsu Kaisen 0, Yuta is voiced by Megumi Ogata in the Japanese version and Kayleigh McKee in the English version. Ogata's role was picked by Akutami himself, finding her ideal for the part, while McKee felt pressure over her work because of her lack of experience when the movie was dubbed.

Yuta has met with positive response. some critics found him more appealing than the protagonist Yuji Itadori due to their different powers and backstories. His appearance in Jujutsu Kaisen also surprised critics due to his changed traits. Additionally, Yuta has been a popular character within the series, appearing in marketing and polls. Ogata's and McKee's performances of Yuta also drew positive responses in the media.

Creation

Manga author Gege Akutami said Yuta and Rika were created as "a combo" for the story before he envisioned the manga's publication. The name  sounded appealing to the author while  was given for his kanji's meaning; "One With Many Friends", which the mangaka also liked. Akutami never intended Tokyo Metropolitan Curse Technical School to be serialized as Yuta's character arc was the sole focus of this short series. As a result, when Jujutsu Kaisen was created, Akutami created a new character, Yuji Itadori, for the leading role while Yuta became supporting. Similarities between Yuta and Itadori include their introduction to jujutsu, tragedy, naivety and having faced death. Despite their similarities, the two have been noted to "carry themselves very differently ... Itadori is outgoing, where Yuta is more reserved".

Yuta and Rika remained in the same form as in the final product. The concept of the story was creating sorcerers whou would be able to stop Yuta and Rika from killing others. Instead of Satoru Gojo, the character meant to recruit Yuta was Maki. Yuta's relatives were meant to be included into the story, most notably his sister who would be taken by Rika over jealousy. Although several changes were made for the official version, Akutami believes it should have kept the original concept. Yamanaka was interested by the storyboard and talked to other members from Shueisha about it. However, Akutami was stressed about expectations. In crafting the ideal protagonist, Akutami wanted Yuta to avoid being like himself. The first scene of Yuta being interrogated was influenced by the anime series Neon Genesis Evangelion which often uses a group known as SEELE that communicates with Gendo Ikari. Akutami included Michizane Sugawara, a famous figure in Japanese history, as an ancestor of Yuta and Gojo as a tribute to the former editor Yamanaka. Akutami recounts that a scene where Yuta comforts his friend Maki surprised his editor Katayama; Katayama commented that Yuta understood Maki's feelings in their interactions. Akutami revised this scene in the storyboard following his editor's praise. 

In retrospect, Akutami found the early design of Yuta too similar to that of fellow jujutsu sorcerer Megumi Fushiguro in the main series, thinking this they might confuse readers. As a result, Akutami changed Yuta's look for the main series. For the series, Akutami teased readers with the possibility Yuta might have been romantically involved with another woman since Rika's death. Yuta's unique white uniform was made to reference problematic students but wears a black one in the final pages to fit with his classmates. Nevertheless, Akutami planned that once Yuta would return in Jujutsu Kaisen, he would once again wear a white uniform in hopes older readers would remember him. When Akutami's father started reading his manga, the manga author started wondering he based on Yuta on his father or Megumi's father, Toji. 

Sunghoo Park, who directed the first season of the series' anime adaptation and prequel film, originally wanted to cover Yuta's story in the anime's first few episodes but later decided to against it. In the original format, Park would dedicate the series' first three episodes to develop Yuji Itadori and then replace him with Okkotsu but the idea was scrapped. Although Yuta is not present in the anime's first season, he was given a brief cameo in the second introduction sequence, which was created months before the studio MAPPA confirmed the production of the Jujutsu Kaisen 0 film. 

Park said that while Yuta and Rika are the main focus of the movie, he still wanted to explore more on his relationship with the supporting cast. Sunghoo Park cast Yuta's voice actor; Ogata's job surprised them because Yuta is a young male being voiced by a woman. In regards to the film's theme song King Gnu's , the lyrics places focus on the relationship between Yuta and Rika. Following the film's release, Park's favorite fight sequence is when Yuta calls Rika to Geto in terms of animation.

Casting

Gege Akutami cast Megumi Ogata as Yuta's Japanese voice, following Park's advice and other staff members. The manga author claimed that the voice he envisioned was "neutral, soft, and kind, and there is also a big emotional swing and head". Ogata further said Yuta is one of the most relatable characters she has ever found due to the parallels she found when comparing his lonely childhood with hers and how both became sociable people. Additionally, she also found Yuta relatable because he continues suffering pain and overcomes his internal struggles.

Ogata had to interact with the director Park to get a better understanding of Yuta as a character. When the film premiered, Ogata said she was satisfied with her work and looked forward to future projects. Fellow voice actors Yuichi Nakamura and Takahiro Sakurai felt that the feeling of "synchronization" is great in regards to Ogata's performance as Yuta. When asked about Ogata, Hanazawa commented through her work; she managed to feel Yuta's love through her partner's work, making the character loveable. In response to that, Ogata praised Hanazawa's work as Rika. In retrospect, Ogata said voicing Yuta was a difficult work due to social distancing protocols. 

In the English dub, Yuta is voiced by Kayleigh McKee. McKee expressed satisfaction over being selected for Yuta's voice, calling the work "amazing, challenging, and so fun". McKee related to Yuta's lonely life and eventual growth, which helped her find the pitch required to voice the character. She also found Yuta's story similar to a coming-of-age story due to his need to learn control Rika while making friends. McKee, who was new to voice work, had fun doing fight scenes because her character makes several types pf sounds, especially because of Yuta's troubling experiences. McKee found the moments where Yuta calms down and makes touch with Rika as the most important for her because they show how kind he can be. Yuta's leading role in the movie made McKee nervous because she never had such a big role in her career.

Characterization and themes

According to the website Real Sound, Yuta is the main focus of Jujutsu Kaisen 0, whose narrative primarily focuses on his growth since Rika's death. Similarly, Polygon said the narrative's theme is Yuta's need to accept the death of Rika. Meanwhile, Anime News Network saw Yuta as an emotionally ambiguous character because of the way he deals with his feelings for Rika after her death. We Got This Covered Yuto stated it is a story focused on traumas, something the main series is known for. Park considers Yuta to be a straightforward teenager whose loneliness is caused by being chased by Rika's curse. While making the film, Megumi Ogata surprised Park by giving Yuta a sensitive characterization. The actress describes Yuta as an attractive character because he becomes stronger when interacting with others. Komatsu noted while at first Yuta appears to be weak, Ogata's performance helps give the character a stronger impression. Rika's curse is also considered the idea of how Yuta can use a major power for a great good. The film expands upon Yuta's personal weaknesses, which are a result of an illness and his rejection of his surroundings. Yuta realizes he and his peers are both accepted through their interactions with one another. Yuta's reluctance to accept Rika's death parallels Yuji Itadori's need to accept his grandfather's death. 

In the series' beginning, Yuta finds salvation in Satoru Gojo, who guides him in controlling Rika in Jujutsu High and avoiding isolation. The Mary Sue said Yuta's growth makes him appealing because he stops wanting to kill himself and starts appreciating his life. Yuta's hero's journey advances through his physical growth, as Maki training him to stand alone allows his change into a hero. Despite his early passivity, Yuta shows a more aggressive personality when his friends are wounded by Suguru Geto, especially when the scene is animated. Fighting Geto and confronting Rika's curse allows Yuta to accept death and recover from the trauma of losing her. McKee was moved by Yuta's motivational speech about being cherished by his classmates and noted a major change of expression towards the climax in his fight against Geto.

Satisfied with her role, McKee considered Yuta to have become more mature. Cullture agreed with McKee in regards to how Yuta is portrayed as a more composed teenager who in one year when compared with his original persona. He is noted to keep trust in his mentor Gojo. Additionally, Yuta is noted to share close connections with his former partners, mostly Maki, despite his absence. However, Cullture noted that there was no romance between them despite the tease made by Panda and Akutami himself.

Appearances

Jujutsu Kaisen 0
Yuta Okkotsu is the protagonist of Tokyo Metropolitan Curse Technical School, retitled Jujutsu Kaisen 0; initially, he is a cursed victim of Special-Grade who is haunted by the spirit of his childhood friend Rika Orimoto. Satoru Gojo takes charge of Yuta's case and enrolls him at Tokyo Prefectural Jujutsu High School, where he befriends  Panda, Maki Zen'in and Toge Inumaki. In his first mission, a wounded Maki motivates Yuta to fight to achieve his goals, allowing him to briefly control Rika and swearing to stop the Curse in the process. After months training with Gojo and the other students, Yuta learns to control his cursed energy and becomes a skilled swordsman, often sparing with Maki. The power of Rika attracts Suguru Geto, a sorcerer who is friendly with Gojo. Geto attacks Yuta and his friends, severely wounding them.

Enraged by Geto's actions, Yuta unleashes Rika's curse, promising to join her if she helps him to defeat Geto. Yuta overwhelms Geto, who escapes after losing an arm in combat. As Gojo kills the escapees, it is revealed Rika did not curse Yuta, but after her death, Yuta's desire to make her survive resulted in him accidentally turning her into a curse demon. Now familiar with his powers, Yuta frees Rika, and she departs to the afterlife with Yuta remaining as sorcerer.

In December 2021, Akutami wrote a new chapter based on Jujutsu Kaisen 0. After Rika's passing, Yuta's group has part-time jobs in a store, where Utahime Iori is a customer. The animated film adds an extra scene where Yuta befriends one of Geto's former allies as they have lunch in Kenya until being interrupted by Gojo.

Jujutsu Kaisen
Yuta does not appear in the early chapters of Jujutsu Kaisen, but Gojo mentions him as one of the upper-level students attending Jujutsu High who may one day surpass him when discussing students with Yuji Itadori. Upon his return to Japan, Yuta saves a child from a spirit surrounded by a replica he calls Rika. Yuta returns to Jujutsu High as an executioner of Yuji for possessing a vengeful spirit called Ryomen Sukuna, also avenging his friend Inumaki who had been wounded by Sukuna. Yuta finds Yuji and his ally Choso fighting one of Maki's relatives, Naoya Zen'in. Yuta easily defeats Yuji and Choso and pretends to kill the former. After telling Naoya to inform their superiors that Yuji is dead, Yuta reveals himself as an ally to the recently revived Yuji. Yuta then reunites with Maki and other sorcerers to help Gojo and promises to kill Yuji if he can no longer control the vengeful spirit. The group joins forces to defeat Kenjaku who aims to curse Japanese civilians through his Culling Game terrorist attack.

Reception

Popularity
In a Viz Media popularity poll conducted in March 2021, Yuta was voted as the eighth-most-popular character in the Jujutsu Kaisen franchise. In a second poll taken in December 2021 by Shonen Jump, he was voted the eighth most popular character once again. To promote the series, Yuta's outfit was added to the NetEase video game Knives Out and a figurine of Yuta holding Rika was released by Shibuya Scramble Figure. A replica of Yuta's sword featuring the shadows of his energy was also produced.

Following the release of the Jujutsu Kaisen 0 movie, Slashfilm listed the character as its third best character behind Rika and Panda. In May 2022, manga author Kenta Shinohara did his own tribute to the character of Yuta alongside Yuji and Megumi. In the Anime Trending 2022 poll, Yuta was voted as one of the best movie characters, ranking 8th in the general "Boy of the Year" category.  In the Newtype annual awards, Yuta was also popular reaching 6th place in the category "Best male character" for his role in the movie. He was also second in the best male character award from Animage 2021 Anime Grand Prix poll behind Tengen Uzui from Demon Slayer: Kimetsu no Yaiba.

Critical response

Critics often praised Yuta's role in Jujutsu Kaisen 0. Several writers enjoyed the handling of his story arc as well as his relationship with his classmates. Comic Book Resources called his story "perfect" for the movie adaptation. while Daryl Harding for Yatta-Tachi and Bleeding Cool found him an appealing character from the shōnen manga demography. Anime News Network and Comic Book Resources criticized Yuta's traits as a common trend in contrast due to his early growth Jacob Parker-Dalton from Otaquest said Yuta is a more interesting and more compelling character than the other lead, Yuji, who feels less active. In regards to his powers, Los Angeles Times compared the pairing of Yuta and Rika with that of the Marvel Comics character Venom  because of the way Yuta has to control Rika's power in order to properly fight. On the other hand, Yuta was criticized for being overpowered due to Rika, making him less relatable. Nevertheless, the potential of power Yuta has was seen as promising because he is connected to the already powerful Satoru Gojo. The Digital Fix noted there are multiple differences between the two leads but found Yuta's story darker than Yuji's. Critics also praised Yuta's fight scenes in the movie, which were deemed superior to most of MAPPA's past works such as The God of High School with Polygon finding him comparable to the superhero Batman based on how energetic he becomes. 

The film adaptation includes a post-credits scene that foreshadows Yuta's inclusion in the main series, which IGN appreciated. Yuta's eventual return to Jujutsu Kaisen surprised critics due to the irony in the former protagonist's role of killing the current one. Comic Book Resources said Yuta's appearance in Jujutsu Kaisen was quite different from the original one upon his reveal. Anime Hunch claimed that the entire fandom was relieved when Yuta was revealed to be acting on Gojo's request to fake Yuji's death, something noticeable by how his personality changes from aggressive in his fake demand to friendly and casual when he finds Yuji and continuously apologizes to him for wounding him. The character's connection with the late Sugawara no Michizane was kept vague that might generate a future impact in the series by critics.

There was also commentary about Yuta's voice actors in the Jujutsu Kaisen 0 film. Some media praised Megumi Ogata's Japanese portrayal of Yuta for making the character stand out as unique in the film, in which when he changes from being calm, which was compared to her early deliveries as Shinji Ikari from Neon Genesis Evangelion, to aggressive, when there are elements of horror and action. ANN and IGN also praised Yuta's relationship with Rika for giving him a less predictable characterization. Fandom Post compared Kayleigh McKee's voice work with that of Spike Spencer, who voiced Shinji in the English dub of the series, and wondered whether it was intentional. Hit equally praised McKee and Ogata for making Yuta more appealing alongside Rika. Pop Culture Maniac was more negative about McKee's work for making him sound childish rather than traumatized.

References

Bibliography 

Anime and manga characters who can move at superhuman speeds
Anime and manga characters who use magic
Anime and manga characters with superhuman strength
Comics characters introduced in 2017
Fictional Japanese people in anime and manga
Fictional characters with energy-manipulation abilities
Fictional characters with healing abilities
Fictional demon hunters
Fictional double agents
Fictional exorcists
Fictional ghost hunters
Fictional kenjutsuka
Fictional male martial artists
Fictional swordfighters in anime and manga
Male characters in anime and manga
Martial artist characters in anime and manga
Teenage characters in anime and manga